The 22669/22670 Ernakulam Patna SF Express is an Express train belonging to Indian Railways Southern zone that runs between  and  in India.

It operates as train number 22669 from Ernakulam Junction to Patna Junction and as train number 22670 in the reverse direction, serving the states of Kerala, Tamil Nadu, Andhra Pradesh, Telangana, Maharashtra, Madhya Pradesh, Uttar Pradesh & Bihar.

Coaches
The 22669 / 22670 Express has two AC 2-tier, five AC 3-tier, seven sleeper class, four general unreserved & two SLR (seating with luggage rake) coaches and two high capacity parcel van coaches. It carries a pantry car.

As is customary with most train services in India, coach composition may be amended at the discretion of Indian Railways depending on demand.

Service

As the average speed of the train is

Schedule

Reversals
ALD – Allahabad Junction railway station

Routing

Traction
Later, an Itarsi Loco Shed-based WDM-3A pulls the train to its destination.

References

External links
16359 Ernakulam Patna Express at India Rail Info
16360 Patna Ernakulam Express at India Rail Info

Express trains in India
Transport in Kochi
Rail transport in Kerala
Rail transport in Tamil Nadu
Rail transport in Andhra Pradesh
Rail transport in Telangana
Rail transport in Maharashtra
Rail transport in Madhya Pradesh
Rail transport in Uttar Pradesh
Rail transport in Bihar
Transport in Patna